Joseph Hallie Keaton (July 6, 1867 – January 13, 1946) was an American vaudeville performer and silent film actor. He was the father of actor Buster Keaton and appeared with his son in several films.

Life and career
Keaton was born a few miles south of Terre Haute, Indiana, to Libbie Jane and Joseph Francis Keaton IV. Leaving home in 1889, the year of the Land Rush, he homesteaded in the Oklahoma territory for a time, securing a claim three and a half miles northwest of Edmond. A few months into Keaton's residency, the neighboring homesteader (a Canadian whom Keaton had befriended on their shared journey west) was murdered and partially buried by a claim jumper; the body was subsequently discovered, and "justice was meted out" to the murderer by Keaton and a group of three or four men that included Robert Galbreath Jr.

On May 31, 1894, Joe Keaton eloped with Myra Edith Cutler, who became known as Myra Keaton. Myra performed with Joe in a vaudeville act called the Two Keatons. Joe and Myra's first child was Joseph Frank Keaton, who became known as the silent film actor Buster Keaton; their other children were Harry Keaton and Louise Keaton.

When Buster was only a few years old, he joined the act, which became the Three Keatons. The act was a rough-and-tumble one, with Buster being thrown around on stage most of the time. As the years went by, Joe Keaton became an alcoholic; when Buster was 21, Myra left him, taking Buster with her.  However, after Buster found success in silent film, he supported Joe and gave him small parts in several movies. Myra and Joe reunited, but eventually split up again. He lived alone in a Hollywood hotel for many years.  He stopped drinking with the help of a girlfriend who was a Christian Scientist.

Death
Joe Keaton died on January 13, 1946, at his home in Hollywood after a long illness, according to the New York Times. However, Buster later said he was hit by a car, and state death records show that he died in Ventura. He was buried in Inglewood Cemetery in Inglewood, California, in an unmarked grave. In 2018, Keaton fans around the world raised the necessary funds and had the grave marked with a headstone.

Filmography

It was announced that Joe Keaton would play a court reporter in Evelyn Prentice (1934), but his actual appearance in the film cannot be confirmed.

See also
 Myra Keaton
 Harry Keaton
 Louise Keaton

References

External links
 
 Keaton biography
 

1867 births
1946 deaths
American male silent film actors
American male film actors
Male actors from California
Male actors from Indiana
American people of Scotch-Irish descent
Vaudeville performers
Actors from Terre Haute, Indiana
People from Ventura County, California
20th-century American male actors